W. Kimryn Rathmell (born November 3, 1969) is an American physician-scientist whose work focuses on the research and treatment of patients with kidney cancers. She is the Hugh Jackson Morgan Professor and Chair of the Department of Medicine at Vanderbilt University Medical Center (VUMC), and Physician-in-Chief for Vanderbilt University Adult Hospital and Clinics in Nashville, Tennessee.

Education 
In 1991, Rathmell graduated from the University of Northern Iowa with a Bachelor of Science (BS) in Biology and a Bachelor of Arts (BA) in Chemistry. She subsequently earned a Doctor of Philosophy (PhD) in Biophysics in 1996 under the mentorship of Gilbert Chu, and a Doctor of Medicine (MD) in 1998 from Stanford University. The title of her PhD thesis was "Ku and DNA/PK in the repair of DNA double strand breaks." Following completion of her MD, Rathmell did an Internal Medicine internship at the University of Chicago before attending the University of Pennsylvania where she completed her Internal Medicine residency and Medical Oncology fellowship training. Rathmell completed additional postdoctoral training at the University of Pennsylvania under the mentorship of M. Celeste Simon, PhD, and at the University of North Carolina at Chapel Hill (UNC) under the mentorship of Terry Van Dyke, PhD. In 2022, she completed a Master of Management in Health Care at the Owen School of Management at Vanderbilt University.

Career 
In 2003, Rathmell joined faculty at UNC where she held primary and secondary appointments in the departments of Medicine and Genetics. While there, she served as Co-Director of the Howard Hughes Medical Institute Graduate Training Program in Translational Medicine, Associate Director for Training and Education at UNC Lineberger Comprehensive Cancer Center, and Associate Director of the Medical Scientist Training Program.  

In 2015, she joined VUMC as Professor of Medicine and Director of the Division of Hematology and Oncology, with secondary appointments in the departments of Cancer Biology and Biochemistry. Rathmell was successively named Cornelius Abernathy Craig Professor of Medicine. In 2019, she was named Deputy Director for Research Integration and Career Development at Vanderbilt-Ingram Cancer Center. She served in this role until her current appointment as the Hugh Jackson Morgan Professor and Chair of the Department of Medicine and Physician-in-Chief for Vanderbilt University Adult Hospital and Clinics in 2020. She is the second woman to serve as Chair of the Department of Medicine at VUMC, and immediately succeeds Nancy J. Brown.

Rathmell has been actively involved in research related to the genetics and molecular biology of complex renal cancers. A member of The Cancer Genome Atlas (TCGA), her research has resulted in more than 200 articles in leading peer-reviewed journals, including The New England Journal of Medicine, Nature, and the Journal of Clinical Investigation.

Rathmell serves on the National Cancer Institute's Board of Scientific Advisors and the Forbeck Foundation Scientific Board of Directors. She is a former associate editor for the Journal of Clinical Investigation, and currently serves as senior editor for eLife. She has previously held leadership roles for the American Society of Clinical Oncology, the Department of Defense Congressionally Directed Medical Research Program (Kidney Cancer Research Program), and the American Society for Clinical Investigation (ASCI), in which she served as society President in 2019-2020.  

Rathmell received the 2020 American Association for Cancer Research Team Science Award for TCGA, and the 2019 Eugene P. Schonfeld Award for Outstanding Contributions in Kidney Cancer from the Kidney Cancer Association. Rathmell has been elected to the ASCI, the Association of American Physicians, and as fellow of the American Association for the Advancement of Science.

Personal life 
Rathmell resides in Nashville with her husband, Jeffrey Rathmell, a professor at VUMC and director for the Vanderbilt Center for Immunobiology. They have two children.

References 

1969 births
Living people
Physician-scientists
American women scientists
Vanderbilt University faculty
Stanford University alumni
University of Northern Iowa alumni